Health Economics, Policy and Law is a quarterly peer-reviewed scientific journal covering health economics, policy, and law. It was established in 2006 and is published by Cambridge University Press. The editor-in-chief is Adam Oliver (London School of Economics). According to the Journal Citation Reports, the journal has a 2016 impact factor of 1.675, ranking it 37th out of 77 journals in the category "Health Policy & Services".

References

External links

Cambridge University Press academic journals
Health economics journals
Health policy journals
Health law journals
Publications established in 2006
English-language journals
Quarterly journals